Gonville is a residential suburb of Whanganui, New Zealand. It is under the local governance of the Whanganui District Council.

Pakaitore Marae and meeting house is located in Gonville. It is the tribal meeting ground of the Ngāti Hāua  (subtribe) of Ngāti Hāua.

Demographics

It had a population of 6,276 at the 2018 New Zealand census, an increase of 342 people (5.8%) since the 2013 census, and an increase of 123 people (2.0%) since the 2006 census. There were 2,478 households. There were 3,063 males and 3,204 females, giving a sex ratio of 0.96 males per female, with 1,416 people (22.6%) aged under 15 years, 1,254 (20.0%) aged 15 to 29, 2,622 (41.8%) aged 30 to 64, and 981 (15.6%) aged 65 or older.

Ethnicities were 74.0% European/Pākehā, 32.5% Māori, 5.6% Pacific peoples, 4.4% Asian, and 1.6% other ethnicities (totals add to more than 100% since people could identify with multiple ethnicities).

The proportion of people born overseas was 10.6%, compared with 27.1% nationally.

Although some people objected to giving their religion, 48.9% had no religion, 35.5% were Christian, 0.8% were Hindu, 0.2% were Muslim, 0.2% were Buddhist and 6.7% had other religions.

Of those at least 15 years old, 510 (10.5%) people had a bachelor or higher degree, and 1,206 (24.8%) people had no formal qualifications. The employment status of those at least 15 was that 1,980 (40.7%) people were employed full-time, 720 (14.8%) were part-time, and 318 (6.5%) were unemployed.

Education

References 

Suburbs of Whanganui
Settlements on the Whanganui River